Cécile Plancherel (born 28 October 1970) is a Swiss snowboarder. She competed at the 1998 Winter Olympics, in giant slalom.

References 

1970 births
Living people
Swiss female snowboarders
Olympic snowboarders of Switzerland
Snowboarders at the 1998 Winter Olympics